William John Coffey (10 October 1896 – 9 April 1962) was an Australian rules footballer who played with Essendon in the Victorian Football League (VFL).

Notes

External links 

1896 births
1962 deaths
Australian rules footballers from Melbourne
Essendon Football Club players
People from Fitzroy, Victoria